Mechurchletukhutsesi was the office of royal treasurer in the Medieval Georgia. The Royal Court Regulations described his position as exclusive: he dealt with customs, income tax, tax on merchants, the supply of money, gems and metal, as well as silver plate, dinner services and valuable fats used for lighting; he watched over city mayors and their expenditure.

See also 
Court officials of the Kingdom of Georgia

References 

Noble titles of Georgia (country)
Georgian words and phrases